Konacık is a village in the Gerger District, Adıyaman Province, Turkey. The village is populated by Kurds of non-tribal affiliation and had a population of 281 in 2021.

The hamlets of Damlıca, Göl, Taşlı and Usluca are attached to the village.

References

Villages in Gerger District
Kurdish settlements in Adıyaman Province